Georgetown Historical Society may refer to organizations in:

 Georgetown, Delaware, including the Delaware Confederate Monument
 Georgetown, Maine, based in the Stone Schoolhouse
 Georgetown, Massachusetts, based in the Brocklebank–Nelson–Beecher House